The Fallsview Tourist Area in Niagara Falls, Ontario, Canada is the main tourist attraction surrounding the Falls. In recent years, it has become the home many of the hotels in the city, such as: the Niagara Falls Hilton, Niagara Falls Marriott Gateway, and the recently opened Comfort Inn Fallsview. Niagara Fallsview Casino Resort is also located near the centre of this area. It is also the location of the Skylon Tower and Minolta Tower.

The area is linked to the Table Rock Center and Journey Behind the Falls, on the Niagara Parkway just above the falls, by the Falls Incline Railway.

Traffic congestion
The Fallsview Tourist area was also known for its gridlock traffic issues. These traffic issues were mostly caused by shortages of parking spaces in the area for tourists during peak demand periods and a lack of transportation services in the area. Main streets through the area (Stanley Avenue and Fallsview Blvd.) have been widened recently to address this issue; however and parking has improved.  The Niagara Parks Commission provided a parking lot (capacity: 200) just north of the Falls Incline Railway and the parking issues have been largely improved.

References

Neighbourhoods in Niagara Falls, Ontario
Tourist attractions in Niagara Falls, Ontario